The 2018 UMass Minutemen football team represented the University of Massachusetts Amherst in the 2018 NCAA Division I FBS football season. This was the fifth year of head coach Mark Whipple's second stint at UMass and 11th year overall. The Minutemen divided their home schedule between two stadiums. Five home games were played at the UMass campus at Warren McGuirk Alumni Stadium with one home game at Gillette Stadium. This was UMass's third year as an independent. They finished the season 4–8.

On November 21, head coach Mark Whipple resigned. He finished with a record of 16–44 in the five years of his second stint as head coach and 65–70 in his eleven overall seasons. On December 3, the school hired Florida State offensive coordinator Walt Bell for the head coaching job.

UMass wide receiver Andy Isabella was named a consensus All-American at year's end.

Previous season
The Minutemen finished the 2017 season 4–8.

Preseason

Award watch lists
Listed in the order that they were released

Schedule

Schedule Source:
☆All Eleven Sports broadcasts will be simulcast on NESN or NESN+.

Game summaries

Duquesne

The Minutemen's game against Duquesne was the first of the 2018 college football season, kicking off 90 minutes before Prairie View A&M–Rice.

at Boston College

at Georgia Southern

at FIU

Charlotte

at Ohio

South Florida

Coastal Carolina

at UConn

Liberty

BYU

at Georgia

Players drafted into the NFL

References

UMass
UMass Minutemen football seasons
UMass Minutemen football